Thomas Courthope Gull (1832 – 5 January 1878) was an early settler of Western Australia who served as a member of the colony's Legislative Council from 1870 to 1872.

Born in London, England, Gull came to Western Australia in 1852. He settled in Guildford (on the outskirts of Perth), and went into partnership with his uncle, Samuel Adams Barker. Their merchant firm, Barker and Gull, survived until 1891, after both their deaths. This property and a neighbouring property co-leased with Barker were used to rear horses. Gull first ran for parliament in 1867, in the unofficial elections held to guide the governor in his nomination process. He was unsuccessful then, but in the first official elections, in 1870, contested and won the seat of Swan.

While in office, Gull was a keen advocate for the construction of what would become known as the Eastern Railway, linking Guildford with Northam. However, he was defeated at the 1872 elections by William Locke Brockman, and subsequently concentrated on his commercial interests. Gull died in Guildford in January 1878, aged only 46, from "congestion of the lungs". He had married Annie Dempster in 1861, with whom he had four sons and two daughters. Two of his brothers-in-law, Andrew and Charles Edward Dempster, and a son, Arthur Courthope Gull, were also members of parliament.

References

1832 births
1878 deaths
Australian merchants
English emigrants to Australia
Members of the Western Australian Legislative Council
Settlers of Western Australia
19th-century Australian politicians
19th-century Australian businesspeople